Paul Willführ (30 October 1885, Hanover – 22 April 1922) was a German track and field athlete who competed in the 1912 Summer Olympics. In 1912 he finished 23rd in the javelin throw competition and 18th in the shot put event. He also participated in the discus throw event but he was unable to set a width all his three attempts were invalid.

References

External links
list of German athletes

1885 births
1922 deaths
Sportspeople from Hanover
German male javelin throwers
German male discus throwers
German male shot putters
Olympic athletes of Germany
Athletes (track and field) at the 1912 Summer Olympics